Carl Adolf Ragnar Olson (10 August 1880 – 10 July 1955) was a Swedish horse rider who competed in the 1928 Summer Olympics. He won a bronze medal in the individual dressage competition with his horse Günstling, and a silver medal as part of the Swedish dressage team.

Olson lived in Hässleholm in southern Sweden. He became famous for housing, during the winter of 1918–1919, the exiled German army chief Erich Ludendorff, after the German World War I capitulation in 1918.

References

External links
Profile

1880 births
1955 deaths
Swedish dressage riders
Olympic equestrians of Sweden
Swedish male equestrians
Equestrians at the 1928 Summer Olympics
Olympic silver medalists for Sweden
Olympic bronze medalists for Sweden
Olympic medalists in equestrian
Medalists at the 1928 Summer Olympics
People from Kristianstad Municipality
Sportspeople from Skåne County